The 2013 Individual Speedway Junior World Championship was the 37th edition of the FIM World motorcycle speedway Under-21 Championships.

The competition retained the 'Grand Prix' style format, but was reduced from seven to three rounds, which took place in June, August and September. It was won by Poland's Patryk Dudek.

Final Series

Classification 
The meeting classification was according to the points scored during the meeting (heats 1–20). The total points scored by each rider during each final meeting (heat 1–20) were credited also as World Championship points. The FIM Speedway Under 21 World Champion was the rider having collected most World Championship points at the end of the series. In case of a tie between one or more riders in the final overall classification, a run-off will decide the 1st, 2nd and 3rd place. For all other placings, the better-placed rider in the last final meeting will be the better placed rider.

See also 
 2013 Speedway Grand Prix
 2013 Team Speedway Junior World Championship

References 
 http://speedwayresults.com/results.php?type=FIM%20U21%20Individual%20Championships%20Final&season=2013

 
2013
World Individual Junior